Dario Torrente (born 1 May 1966) is a South African épée, foil and sabre fencer. He competed at the 1992 and 2008 Summer Olympics.

References

External links
 

1966 births
Living people
South African male épée fencers
Olympic fencers of South Africa
Fencers at the 1992 Summer Olympics
Fencers at the 2008 Summer Olympics
South African male foil fencers
South African male sabre fencers